Bahamarz (also Romanized as Bahāmarz; also known as Bāmarz) is a village in Momenabad Rural District, in the Central District of Sarbisheh County, South Khorasan Province, Iran. At the 2006 census, its population was 121, in 34 families.

References 

Populated places in Sarbisheh County